Frederick Augustus III (25 May 1865 – 18 February 1932), was the last King of Saxony (1904–1918). Born in Dresden, Frederick Augustus was the eldest son of King George of Saxony and his wife, Maria Anna of Portugal.

Though well-loved by his subjects, he voluntarily abdicated as king on 13 November 1918, after the defeat of the German Empire in World War I. He died in Sibyllenort in Lower Silesia (now Szczodre in Poland) and was buried in Dresden.

Military career
Frederick Augustus entered the Royal Saxon Army in 1877 as a second lieutenant, despite being only twelve years old. Given his royal status, he advanced rapidly through the ranks. He served initially with the Royal Saxon 1. (Leib-) Grenadier Regiment Nr. 100. He was promoted to first lieutenant in 1883, captain in 1887, major in 1889 and lieutenant colonel in 1891. By 1891, he was commander of the 1st Battalion of Schützen (Füsilier)-Regiment Nr. 108. He was promoted to colonel on 22 September 1892 and took command of the Schützen (Füsilier)-Regiment Nr. 108 on the same day. On 20 September 1894, the 29-year-old prince was promoted to Generalmajor and given command of the 1st Royal Saxon Infantry Brigade Nr. 45 (Saxon higher units usually bore two numbers: one their Saxon Army number and the other their number in the Prussian Army order of battle). On 22 May 1898, he was promoted to Generalleutnant and given command of the 1st Royal Saxon Infantry Division Nr. 23. He commanded this division until 26 August 1902, when he took command of the XII (1st Royal Saxon) Corps. He was promoted to General der Infanterie one month later, on 24 September. He remained in command of the corps until October 1904, when he became king. His military career effectively ended with his accession to the throne, but he was promoted subsequently to Generaloberst and then to Generalfeldmarschall (on 9 September 1912).

Following his father's accession, he was in July 1902 appointed à la suite of the German Marine Infantry by Emperor Wilhelm II during a visit to Kiel.

Family
Frederick Augustus married Archduchess Louise of Austria, in Vienna on 21 November 1891. They were divorced in 1903 by the royal decree of the King after she ran away while pregnant with her last child. Luise's flight from Dresden was due to her father-in-law's threatening to have her interned in a mental asylum at the Sonnenstein Castle for life. Her brother supported her in her wish to escape from Saxony. Emperor Franz-Josef of Austria-Hungary did not recognise the divorce.

They had seven children:
 Friedrich August Georg, Crown Prince of Saxony (1893–1943). After becoming a Jesuit priest, he renounced his rights in 1923. He was allegedly assassinated by the SS or Gestapo in 1943.
 Friedrich Christian, Margrave of Meissen, Duke of Saxony (1893–1968). Married Princess Elisabeth Helene of Thurn and Taxis (1903–1976) and had issue.
 Ernst Heinrich (1896–1971). Married first Princess Sophie of Luxembourg (1902–1941), daughter of Guillaume IV, Grand Duke of Luxembourg, in 1921 and second Virginia Dulon (1910–2002) in 1947 (morganatically). Had issue with Sophie.
 Maria Alix Carola, stillborn 22 August 1898
 Margarete Carola Wilhelmine (1900–1962). Married Prince Friedrich of Hohenzollern (1891–1965).
 Maria Alix Luitpolda (1901–1990). Married Franz Joseph, Prince of Hohenzollern-Emden (1891–1964).
 Anna Monika Pia (1903–1976). Married firstly Archduke Joseph Franz of Austria (1895–1957) and secondly Reginald Kazanjian (1905–1990).

Their two eldest sons, Friedrich August and Friedrich Christian, were both born in 1893, but were not twins. Friedrich August was born in January, and Friedrich Christian was born in December.

Quotes
 When standing in uniform on a station platform, he was asked by a lady to move her trunk. He is reported to have replied, "Madam, I am not a porter; I only look like one."
 When the German Republic was proclaimed in 1918, he was asked by telephone whether he would abdicate willingly. He said: "Oh, well, I suppose I'd better."
 When cheered by a crowd in a railway station several years after his abdication, he stuck his head out of the train's window and shouted "Ihr seid mer ja scheene Demogradn!" (Saxon for "You're a fine lot of democrats, I'll say!").

Decorations and awards

Ancestry

Notes

External links

1865 births
1932 deaths
Nobility from Dresden
Field marshals of the German Empire
House of Wettin
Kings of Saxony
Burials at Dresden Cathedral
Saxon princes
German Roman Catholics
Crown Princes of Saxony
Grand Crosses of the Military Order of Max Joseph
Knights of the Golden Fleece of Austria
Grand Crosses of the Order of Saint Stephen of Hungary
Grand Crosses of the Military Order of Maria Theresa
Recipients of the Pour le Mérite (military class)
Recipients of the Iron Cross (1914), 1st class
Recipients of the Iron Cross (1914), 2nd class
Knights of Malta
Grand Crosses of the Order of the Star of Romania
2
2
Albertine branch